Edimo Ferreira Campos (born 15 January 1983), commonly known as Edinho, is a Brazilian professional footballer who plays as a defensive midfielder.

Career
In January 2010, Palmeiras confirmed that the club signed another reinforcement for the team. This season, the club signed the defensive midfielder for 4 years, until December 2013.

In January 2011, Fluminense sign the player for peticion by, Muricy Ramalho, coach of the Fluminense.

On 19 December 2013, with the end of his contract with Fluminense, transferred to the Grêmio for the 2014 season.

On the June 6, 2016, it was involved in a change for player Negueba, in the which Edinho will act for Coritiba.

Career statistics

Honours

Club
Internacional
Campeonato Gaúcho: 2003, 2004, 2005, 2008
Copa Libertadores: 2006
FIFA Club World Cup: 2006
Recopa Sudamericana: 2007
Copa Sudamericana: 2008

Fluminense
Campeonato Carioca: 2012
Campeonato Brasileiro Série A: 2012

Coritiba
Campeonato Paranaense: 2017

References

External links

1983 births
Living people
Sportspeople from Niterói
Brazilian footballers
Association football midfielders
Campeonato Brasileiro Série A players
Campeonato Brasileiro Série B players
Serie A players
Serie B players
Boavista Sport Club players
Sport Club Internacional players
Sociedade Esportiva Palmeiras players
Fluminense FC players
Grêmio Foot-Ball Porto Alegrense players
Coritiba Foot Ball Club players
Centro Sportivo Alagoano players
Ceará Sporting Club players
Vila Nova Futebol Clube players
U.S. Lecce players
Brazilian expatriate footballers
Brazilian expatriate sportspeople in Italy
Expatriate footballers in Italy